Augusta Larned ( – ) was an American author, editor, and suffragist.  

She began her literary career in 1867, writing for The Independent. In 1870, she edited the women's rights journal The Revolution. For 20 years, she wrote for The Christian Register.James Grant Wilson and John Fiske, (Eds.). (1887). Appletons' Cyclopædia of American Biography (Vol. 3). New York: D. Appleton & Co.

Larned lived for many years in Summit, New Jersey.  She wrote a book, The Borderland of Country Life (1919), describing the changes the automobile made to Summit, called "Heaven's Hill" in her work.

Augusta Larned died on 8 January 1924.

Bibliography 
 Home Stories (1872-78), six volumes
 Talks with Girls (1873)
 Old Tales Retold from Grecian Mythology (1875)
 The Norse Grandmother, Tales from the Eddas (1880)
 Village Photographs (1887)
 In Woods and Fields (1895)
 The Borderland of Country Life (1919)

References 

Created via preloaddraft
1835 births
1924 deaths
American women writers